Charles Dickinson may refer to:
 Charles Dickinson (FRS) (1755–1827), English magistrate and amateur scientist
 Charles Dickinson (historical figure) (1780–1806), American planter fatally wounded by Andrew Jackson
 Charles Dickinson (writer) (born 1951), American novelist
 Charles Dickinson (bishop) (1792–1842), Anglican bishop
 Charles Dickinson (priest) (1871–1930), Archdeacon of Bristol
 Charles Dickinson (footballer), Argentine footballer

See also
Charles Dickinson West (1847–1908), Irish mechanical engineer and naval architect